Bedros is a name in Eastern Armenian meaning "rockhard", and is thus a form of the name Peter. Bedrosian (Eastern Armenian Petrosyan), meaning "son of Bedros / Petros" is also a common Armenian name.

Religious personalities
Armenian Apostolic Church
Peter I of Armenia, i.e. Bedros I Ketadarz (d. 1058)
Bedros IV of Cilicia, Bedros IV Sarajian (1870–1940), Armenian Catholicos of Great House of Cilicia
Various men who served as Armenian Patriarchs of Constantinople
Various men who served as Armenian Patriarchs of Jerusalem

Armenian Catholic Church
All Armenian Catholic Patriarch-Catholicoi carry Bedros as a middle name, including:
Abraham Petros I Ardzivian, Patriarch Catholicos of Cilicia in 1740–1749
Jacob Petros II Hovsepian, Patriarch Catholicos of Cilicia in 1749–1753
Michael Petros III Kasparian, Patriarch Catholicos of Cilicia in 1753–1780
Basile Petros IV Avkadian, Patriarch Catholicos of Cilicia in 1780–1788
Grégoire-Pierre XV Agagianian (1895–1971)
Ignatius Bedros XVI Batanian (1899–1979) 
Hemaiag Bedros XVII Ghedighian (1905–1998)
Hovhannes Bedros XVIII Kasparian (1927–2011)
Nerses Bedros XIX Tarmouni (1940-2015)
Krikor Bedros XX Gabroyan (born 1934)

Given name
Some people with this given name include:
Petros Adamian or Bedros Atamian (1849–1891), Ottoman-Armenian actor, poet, writer, artist and public figure
Bedros Bedrosian (born 1955), Romanian Armenian triple jumper 
Bedros Hadjian (1933–2012), Buenos Aires-based Armenian writer, educator and journalist
Bedros Kapamajian (1840–1912), Ottoman-Armenian businessmen, textile trader, and mayor of the town of Van, Ottoman Empire
Bedros Keresteciyan (1840–1907), Ottoman-Armenian linguist, journalist, translator, and writer of the first etymology dictionary of the Turkish language
Bedros Kirkorov (born 1932), Bulgarian and Russian singer and bandleader of Armenian origin
Bedros Magakyan (1826–1891), Ottoman-Armenian actor and theater director and founder of the Armenian Oriental Theatre
Bedros Parian (1873–1896), better known by his nom de guerre Papken Siuni, important figure in the Armenian national movement and the Armenian Revolutionary Federation
Bedros Sirabyan (1833–1898), Ottoman-Armenian painter
Bedros Tourian (1851–1872), famous Western Armenian poet, playwright and actor.

See also
Petrosian / Bedrosian / Bedrossian

Armenian masculine given names